This is a list of the wool, cotton and other textile mills in North Yorkshire

Arncliffe

Askrigg

Aysgarth

Bainbridge

Bentham

Bewerley

Bilton With Harrogate

Birstwith

Bishop Thornton

Brearton

Carleton

Cononley

Cowling

Dacre

Embsay With Eastby

Farnhill

Fewston

Gargrave

Giusburn

Grassington

Hartlington

Hartwith Cum Winsley

Hawes

Healey With Sutton (Healey)

Heslington

Hartwith Cum Winsley

Ingleton

Kirkby Malham

Knaresborough

Langcliffe

Lothersdale

Menwith With Darley

Mickley (Azerley)

Plompton

Scriven (Harrogate;Knaresborough)

Settle

Skipton

Sutton-in-Craven (Sutton)

Thornthwaite With Padside

Thruscross

Winksley

York

References

Footnotes

The National Monument Record is a legacy numbering system maintained 
by English Heritage. Further details on each mill may be obtained from this url. http://yorkshire.u08.eu/

Notes

Bibliography

External links

 01
North Yorkshire
North Yorkshire
Lists of buildings and structures in North Yorkshire
North Yorkshire
History of the textile industry